Universiade records in the sport of track cycling are ratified by the International University Sports Federation (FISU).

Men

Women

References

Track cycling records
Cycling at the Summer Universiade
Universiade
Cycling